As per Government of India census data of 2011, the total number of Urdu speakers in India were 62,772,631. According to the census guidelines, "Urdu" does not broadly refer to the Hindostani language, but merely the literary-register of the macrolanguage predominantly self-identified as a spoken language by muslims in India, hence accounting Hindi as a separate language.

Urdu is officially recognised in India and has official status in the National Capital Territory of Delhi to which the language has remained deeply attached through its medieval history of Muslim sultanates and empires and the Indian states and union territories of Uttar Pradesh, Bihar, Telangana and Jammu and Kashmir.

Regional distribution
Following is a list of States and Union Territories of India by speakers of Urdu census data with estimated 2001 speakers.

For census data of 1991:GOI census 1991: DISTRIBUTION OF 10,000 PERSONS BY LANGUAGE - INDIA, STATES AND UNION TERRITORIES - 1991

Speaker strength
Following is speaker's strength data of Urdu language for decades of 1971, 1981, 1991 & 2001:

Ranking
Following is ranking data of Urdu language for  decades of 1971, 1981, 1991 & 2001:

"**" Census was not conducted in the former state of Jammu and Kashmir

See also
States of India by urban population
States of India by size of economy
Muslims of Uttar Pradesh

References

External links
http://censusindia.gov.in/2011-prov-results/data_files/india/Final_PPT_2011_chapter5.pdf
GOI census 2001: Population by religious communities

Urdu speakers
Urdu language
Urdu-speaking countries and territories